The R211 is a new technology train (NTT) New York City Subway car being built by Kawasaki Railcar Manufacturing for the B Division and the Staten Island Railway (SIR). They will replace two aging subway car models: all R44 cars on the Staten Island Railway and all R46 subway cars. The order is split into three parts: R211A and R211T cars for the subway and R211S cars for the SIR. The R211Ts employ open gangways between cars, a feature not present on current rolling stock. The base order consists of 535 cars, with options for up to 1,077 additional cars.

Planning for the R211 order started in 2011. The design process started in 2012, at which time the order was supposed to consist of  cars. After several changes to the proposal, the Metropolitan Transportation Authority (MTA) awarded a contract to Kawasaki in January 2018. Delivery of the pilot cars began at the end of June 2021. They contain new features such as wider doors, information displays, LED-lit doorways, open gangways, and LED interior lighting. The R211As entered service on March 10, 2023, beginning a 30-day acceptance test.

Component orders
With all options exercised, the Metropolitan Transportation Authority (MTA) plans to spend $3.686 billion in the order. The contract is split into three parts: R211A, R211S, and R211T. The majority of the 535-car base order will comprise 440 R211A cars that will partially replace the aging 748-car R46 fleet. There are also 20 R211T open gangway prototype cars, first delivered in late 2022, and 75 R211S cars that will replace the now 50 year old remaining 61-car R44 fleet on the Staten Island Railway. As a result, the 752 R46s would need to be replaced by 940 R211s.

There will be two options for additional cars: the first for 640 R211A cars and the second for 437 R211A or R211T cars. Option 2 is designed to accommodate either standard cars or open gangway cars, depending on the test results from the 20 R211T cars from the base order. If all options are exercised, the order would total 1,612 cars. Any additional cars that do not replace existing rolling stock will be used to expand the system's fleet.

The R211 order would provide 1,015 new cars to replace the existing fleet, as well as up to 597 cars for fleet expansions following the extension of the Second Avenue Subway and the automation of the New York City Subway. The R211Ts would also increase capacity and allow passengers to walk seamlessly from one car to the next.

Features

This door width will also promote accessibility on the cars, making them the first fully accessible subway car in New York City.

The new cars have digital advertisements, digital customer information displays, illuminated door opening alerts, and security cameras, unlike the current New Technology Trains, which lack these features. Each car contains an on-board computer system that could detect breakdowns in critical systems such as braking and door-opening.

It was announced in July 2016 that some of the cars would have open gangways, allowing passengers to move between cars during train movement. The prototype cars contain two designs; the first ten cars utilize interior panels in the gangway connection, and the other ten use interior bellows in the gangway connection. The latter design also contains a wider walkway and handles between cars. To test out the curve radius and gangway flex in the existing 60-foot-long cars, an R143 test train was equipped with measuring gauges and was operated on most parts of the B Division. 

Compared to previous New Tech train orders, the R211s have seen vast changes. On the exterior, the cars have a blue front with large windows, LED headlights, and a blue stripe with gold accents on the sides, similar to the new MTA Regional Bus Operations livery released in 2016. To designate the route, a large LED screen with the route bullet is displayed at the ends of the train, similar to the rollsigns on older trains (R40 to R68A). The route's destination is displayed above the door on the front, similar to the overhead rollsign arrangement last used on the R38 cars from 1966, which displayed both the route and destination. On the sides, there is a screen that displays both the route bullet and the route's destination, also similar to rollsign-equipped trains.

There are also several changes in interior appearance. Updated digital displays are installed over doors. The seating on the inside is blue and gold, and flip seats are installed to allow for space for wheelchairs. There are also looped stanchions, a feature found in some R46, R62A, and R160 cars, as well as on all R179 cars.

In addition to various screens throughout the train, touch screen displays are present throughout the subway cars, allowing people to zoom in and out of the map. Most of the screens also display additional information, such as specific bus transfers, elevator locations, and which car the customer is located in. However, this feature was not shown to be operational during the first few days of passenger service, but may become operational in the near future.

All R211A and R211T cars are equipped for communications-based train control (CBTC) in conjunction with the ongoing automation of B Division lines. All R211S cars are equipped with cab signaling.

History

Initial request for proposals
The R211 Design Master Plan was approved by the MTA in December 2011, and design planning began in December 2012. An R211 solicitation was posted in the classified section of Metro Magazine'''s May 9, 2013, issue, stating the proposal to acquire these cars in the near future. At the time, the order was planned to be  in length, the same length as the R46 cars. Open-gangways, which would allow passengers to seamlessly walk throughout the train or units, and other alternate configurations were also initially considered for the entire order.

By the release of the MTA's 2015-2019 Capital Program in October 2015, the order specified  cars, which has been the standard length of new B Division cars since the R143 order. , open-gangways will be tested on ten cars (now designated as the R211T). Additionally, the order was broken up into a base order of 565 R211A cars and two option orders: the first for 375 R211A cars, and a second for up to 520 R211As.

The Request for Proposal (RFP) was issued on July 22, 2016, and the contract was to be put out for bidding. With the RFP, the breakup of the order was changed. The base order consisted of 285 cars, with 10 R211T cars, 75 R211S cars, and 200 R211A cars. There were still two option orders; the first option order contained 740 cars (either R211As or R211Ts, depending on the success of the R211Ts in the base order), and the second base order contained 520 cars. However, in January 2017, the contract was pushed back to mid-2017.

On April 24, 2017, at the New York City Transit Board Meeting, the breakdown of the order was changed once again. The base order now includes 535 cars (an increase of 250 cars), with 10 R211T cars, 75 R211S cars, and 450 R211A cars. The option order now consisted of between 490 and 640 R211T cars. This change was made to allow for faster deliveries of the R211 cars. The R211As, with their standard configuration, would be delivered in 2021, earlier than the open-gangway R211T cars, which would not be delivered until at least 2023.

Contract

 Creation of mockup and contract award 

In May 2017, the MTA quietly built a mockup of the R211 in a sparsely-used section of the 34th Street–Hudson Yards station's mezzanine, hidden behind a construction wall. The New York Daily News'' first reported on the mockup's existence in September of that year. The mockup contains features such as the open-gangway designs, digital screens showing next stops and their station layouts, multicolor lights next to the doors to indicate which set of doors will open, and a blue-and-gold-stripe paint design on its exterior. The model was completed and was made publicly accessible from November 30 to December 6, 2017, so riders could review it.

In August 2017, Bombardier Transportation, who was manufacturing the R179s at the time, was banned from bidding on the R211 contract due to various delays and problems associated with the R179 contract. Shortly afterward, it was reported that CRRC had also opted out of contention for the R211 contract, leaving Kawasaki Heavy Industries and Alstom Transport as two of the likely bidders for the contract.

On January 19, 2018, the MTA Board suggested that Kawasaki Rail Car, Inc, a subsidiary of Kawasaki Heavy Industries of Kobe, Japan, be awarded the $1.4 billion base order for the first 535 new R211 cars. The cars are anticipated to be delivered from 2020 to 2023, with the option orders to be delivered by 2025. The R211 base order includes 20 R211T cars with open gangways; 75 R211S cars for the Staten Island Railway, to be delivered near the end of the base order; and 440 R211A cars similar to the R143/R160 series. All cars in the base order will operate in five-car units. The first test train was then expected to be delivered in July 2020, with the production cars being delivered between 2021 and 2023. The cars are being assembled at Kawasaki's factories in the U.S. at Lincoln, Nebraska, and Yonkers, New York, as well as in Japan at Kobe, Hyōgo Prefecture.

Option orders 
In October 2018, it was confirmed that the second option order would consist of 89 sets, and in September 2019, it was confirmed that the 89 sets would be formed from 437 cars. The MTA also confirmed in September 2019 that the first option order would also consist of 640 cars. The entire order will consist of 1,612 cars with both options exercised. The delivery of the base order is scheduled to be completed by August 2023, with option 1 and option 2 completed by December 2024 and October 2025 respectively.  

In October 2022, the MTA Board voted to exercise the first option order for 640 cars at a cost of US $1.7 billion. All cars in the first option order would be R211A cars. The cars in the option order would be delivered from February 2025 to December 2026.

Delivery

Delays in delivery 
By January 2019, the first R211A train was scheduled to be delivered in July 2020, but was delayed to January 2021. Thereafter, new R211 cars would have been produced and delivered at a rate of 30 to 40 cars per month. The first two test trains of ten R211T open-gangway cars would have been delivered in May 2021, followed by the first 5-car set of R211S cars for the Staten Island Railway in December 2021. Under the schedule outlined in January 2019, the base order of R211 cars would begin delivery in October 2021 and continue to be delivered through mid-2023. If the two option orders of 1,077 cars were exercised, deliveries would have continued through late 2025. A decision on whether to make the first option order as open-gangway or standard trainsets was needed to be decided by late 2022; by late October 2022, the first option order was confirmed to comprise standard trainsets. It was also announced in January 2019 that Kawasaki had made a full-car mock-up of the R211 fleet.

In late November 2020, the MTA announced that delivery of the first cars was delayed to the first quarter of 2021. The onset of the COVID-19 pandemic had impacted global supply chains and the delivery of the first cars was delayed by between 9 and 14 months. By January 2021, the first cars were scheduled to arrive in April. The R211T open-gangway test trains were delayed to April 2022, while the R211S Staten Island Railway test train was delayed to August 2022. Deliveries of the base order of R211As were scheduled for September 2022 to September 2024, while deliveries of the R211S cars were scheduled for October 2023 to June 2024. Kawasaki planned to deliver 22 cars per month, a rate that an independent engineering consultant for the MTA described as "aggressive".

In late March 2021, TV station NY1 reported that delivery of the first cars had slipped further, with the arrival of the first cars delayed to June 2021. At its June 2021 meeting, the MTA's Capital Program Oversight Committee announced the R211A pilot had been delayed to July 2021 and the R211T test train had been delayed to June 2022. The production of the R211A base order, the R211S test train, and the rest of the R211S order had the same timeline as was outlined in January 2021. Some of the other issues with the test train, such as cracks in the HVAC frame, had been identified in previous months and fixed. The base order of R211As had to be underway by November 2023 so there would be enough cars to test a communications-based train control (CBTC) system being installed on the IND Eighth Avenue Line. By July 2022, full delivery of the R211A base order and the R211S order had been delayed to 2025 due to labor issues at Kawasaki's Nebraska factory. Kawasaki was obligated to construct 40 cars per month in Nebraska as part of its contract with the MTA.

Delivery 
Starting on June 29, 2021, the first set of R211As (4060–4064) was delivered to the New York City Transit Authority. The next five cars (4065–4069) were delivered starting on July 12, 2021, forming a complete pilot ten-car train for acceptance testing and evaluation. The test train was delivered despite a lack of staff in Nebraska and a shortage of important parts, which prompted an independent engineering consultant to predict that delivery of the test train could be delayed past July 2021. 

The first of the R211T cars with the first gangway design were delivered on October 31, 2022. By December 2022, the pilot set began testing. The first of the R211T cars with the second gangway design were delivered a few months later, in January 2023.

As of September 2022, at least one R211S, numbered 100, had been manufactured.

Service
During a media preview of the R211T cars in February 2023 at Coney Island Yard, it was announced that the R211T cars are expected to enter revenue service in late 2023.

Notes

References

External links

 MTA Capital Program 2015-2019 (page 15)
 R211 digital mock (page 18)
 R211 Design Concepts
 Contract proposal as of March 18, 2016
 RFP Addendums
 R211 Contract
 R211 Technical Specifications

New York City Subway rolling stock
Kawasaki multiple units